The 2008 San Francisco Board of Supervisors elections occurred on November 4, 2008. Seven of the eleven seats of the San Francisco Board of Supervisors were contested in this election. Four incumbents were termed out of office, while three ran for reelection.

Municipal elections in California are officially non-partisan, though most candidates in San Francisco do receive funding and support from various political parties. The election was held using ranked-choice voting.

Results

District 1 

This district consists of the Richmond District. Incumbent supervisor Jake McGoldrick was termed out of office.

District 3 

District 3 consists of the northeastern corner of San Francisco, including Chinatown, the Financial District, Fisherman's Wharf, Nob Hill, North Beach, and Telegraph Hill. Incumbent supervisor Aaron Peskin was termed out of office.

Ranked-choice vote distribution

District 4 

District 4 consists primarily of the Sunset district. Incumbent supervisor Carmen Chu was seeking her first election after being appointed by Mayor Gavin Newsom in the wake of Ed Jew's suspension and resignation.

District 5 

District 5 consists of the Fillmore, Haight-Ashbury, Hayes Valley, Japantown, UCSF, and the Western Addition. Incumbent supervisor Ross Mirkarimi was seeking reelection.

District 7 

District 7 consists of City College, Forest Hill, Lake Merced, Mount Davidson, Parkmerced, San Francisco State University, St. Francis Wood, and Twin Peaks. Incumbent supervisor Sean Elsbernd was seeking reelection.

District 9 

District 9 consists of Bernal Heights, the Inner Mission, and part of the Portola. Incumbent supervisor Tom Ammiano was termed out of office.

Ranked-choice vote distribution

District 11 

District 11 consists of the Excelsior, Ingleside, Oceanview, and the Outer Mission. Incumbent supervisor Gerardo Sandoval was termed out of office.

Ranked-choice vote distribution

References

External links 
City and County of San Francisco Department of Elections

San Francisco Board of Supervisors
Board of Supervisors 2008
San Francisco-related lists
Election 2008
San Francisco Board of Supervisors